Nakasongola District is a district in the Central Region of Uganda. The town of Nakasongola is the site of the district's administrative headquarters.

Location
Nakasongola District is bordered by Apac District to the north-west, Amolatar District to the north-east, Kayunga District to the east, Luweero District to the south, Nakaseke District to the south-west, and Masindi District to the north-west.

Overview
Nakasongola District was created in 1997. Before that, it was part of Luweero District. The commission of inquiry into the local government system in 1987 recognized that Nakasongola was too far away from the administrative center of Luweero to be administered directly from there. Nakasongola suffered from relative neglect due to the distance from the then district headquarters. This became the basis for the creation of Nakasongola District in 1997. The district is composed of three counties, namely: 
 Kyabujingo County
 Buruuli County
 Budyebo County

Population
The 1991 national census put the district population at about 100,500. In 2002, the census estimated the population at 127,100 people, of whom 62,312 (49.7 percent) were female and 62,985 (50.3 percent) were male. In 2012, the population of the district was estimated at 156,500.

See also
Districts of Uganda

References

External links
 Nakasongola District Creates New Counties
 Tourism Potential of Nakasongola District

 
Districts of Uganda
Central Region, Uganda
Lake Kyoga